Netechma camelana is a species of moth of the family Tortricidae. It is found in Ecuador (Pichincha Province) and Colombia.

The wingspan is 17.5 mm. The ground colour of the forewings is white, in the basal part it is tinged with cream. The markings are black. The hindwings are white cream, slightly tinged with pale brownish posteriorly.

Etymology
The species name refers to the shape of the costa of the valve and is derived from Greek kamelos (meaning camel).

References

Moths described in 2008
Netechma